Mohammad Mohsin (born 31 December 1993) is a Pakistani cricketer. He made his first-class debut for Water and Power Development Authority in the President's Trophy on 22 January 2014. He made his List A debut for Water and Power Development Authority in the 2011–12 Faysal Bank One Day National Cup on 8 March 2012. He made his Twenty20 debut for Multan in the 2018–19 National T20 Cup on 11 December 2018.

In October and November 2021, Mohsin played for Negombo Cricket Club in the 2021–22 Major Clubs Limited Over Tournament in Sri Lanka.

Mohsin made his PSL debut in 2019 and has since played for both Peshawar Zalmi and Islamabad United. He has also played in the Pakistan Cup, National T20 Cup, and other domestic tournaments.

References

External links
 

1993 births
Living people
Pakistani cricketers
Place of birth missing (living people)
Lahore Whites cricketers
Multan cricketers
Water and Power Development Authority cricketers
Southern Punjab (Pakistan) cricketers
Negombo Cricket Club cricketers